Lal Sobujer Sur is a 2016 Bangladeshi film directed by Mushfikur Rahman Guljar and starring Subrata Barua, Jhuna Chowdhury, Rafiqullah Selim, Shera Zaman and Omar Sani. The screenplay by Faridur Reza Sagar is based on his novel of the same name. Sagar also produced the film. The film is set in 1971 during the Bangladesh liberation war. It was released on 16 December 2016.

Cast
 Subrata Barua
 Jhuna Chowdhury
 Rafiqullah Selim
 Omar Sani
 Shera Zaman

References

External links
 
 Lal Sobujer Sur at the Bangla Movie Database (in Bengali)

2010s Bengali-language films
2016 war drama films
Bangladeshi war drama films
Bengali-language Bangladeshi films
Government of Bangladesh grants films